Holly Bryce Hyder (born 13 March 1988) is a former Australian cricketer. A right-arm fast-medium bowler, she represented Western Australia in 11 List A matches in the Women's National Cricket League (WNCL) between the 2004–05 and 2008–09 seasons. She also made two appearances for Western Australia in the Australian Women's Twenty20 Cup.

References

External links
 
 

1988 births
Living people
Australian cricketers
Australian women cricketers
Cricketers from Western Australia
Sportswomen from Western Australia
Western Australia women cricketers